In 1944, Billboard magazine published a chart ranking the "most popular records in Harlem" under the title of the Harlem Hit Parade.  Placings were based on a survey of record stores primarily in the Harlem district of New York City, an area that has historically been noted for its African American population and called the "black capital of America".  The chart is considered to be the start of the lineage of the magazine's multimetric R&B chart, which since 2005 has been published under the title Hot R&B/Hip Hop Songs.

Most of 1944's number ones were in the jazz and swing genres, which were among the most popular styles of music in the early 1940s.  Four acts achieved more than one chart-topper during the year: Louis Jordan and his Tympany Five with "Ration Blues" and "G.I. Jive", Duke Ellington and his Famous Orchestra with "Do Nothing till You Hear from Me" and "Main Stem", the Ink Spots and Ella Fitzgerald with "Cow-Cow Boogie (Cuma-Ti-Yi-Yi-Ay)" and "Into Each Life Some Rain Must Fall", and the King Cole Trio with "Straighten Up and Fly Right" and "Gee, Baby, Ain't I Good to You".  Jordan's version of "G.I. Jive" was the second recording of the song to top the chart in 1944, following a rendition by Johnny Mercer with Paul Weston and his Orchestra earlier in the year.  It was the most successful of many songs released during World War II which bemoaned life in the army.  Jordan was by far the most successful artist of the 1940s on Billboards R&B charts.  His tally of 18 chart-toppers was a record which would stand until the 1980s, and he spent 113 weeks at number one, a record which would still stand in the 21st century.  His jump blues style was also a major influence on the later development of rock and roll.  The King Cole Trio had the highest total number of weeks at number one in 1944, spending 14 weeks in the top spot; pianist and vocalist Nat King Cole would soon move on from the jazz field to become a hugely successful pop artist.

Two of 1944's Harlem Hit Parade number ones had sufficient crossover appeal to also top Billboards all-genres Most Played Juke Box Records chart: Jordan's version of "G.I. Jive" in July and  "Into Each Life Some Rain Must Fall" by Fitzgerald and the Ink Spots in December.  Two others topped the Most Played Juke Box Folk Records chart, which was first published in the issue of Billboard dated January 8 and covered "Hillbillies, Spirituals, Cowboy Songs, etc"; the latter chart is considered to be the start of the lineage of the magazine's country music chart.  "Ration Blues" by Jordan topped the Harlem chart in the issue of Billboard dated January 1 and the Folk chart eight weeks later.  "Straighten Up and Fly Right" by the King Cole Trio topped both listings simultaneously in June.  "Into Each Life Some Rain Must Fall" was the year's final Harlem chart-topper, spending the last five weeks of 1944 at number one.

Chart history

Notes
a.  Jordan's first 16 number ones occurred at a time when Billboard published only one R&B chart.  His final two number ones occurred during a period when the magazine published two charts and each topped both listings, but the figure of 113 weeks at number one does not double-count weeks when he topped both.

References

1944
1944 record charts
1944 in American music